Abraham Cohen (1887, Reading, Berkshire – 1957) was a Jewish-British scholar. He was the editor of the Soncino Books of the Bible and also participated in the Soncino translation of the Talmud and Midrash. He attended the University of London and Cambridge and was a minister of Birmingham Hebrew Congregation from 1933. He also participated  actively in the World Jewish Congress and the Zionist movement.

Works
Everyman's Talmud The Major Teachings of the Rabbinic  Sages (1932)
The Parting of the Ways: Judaism and the Rise of  Christianity (1954)
 Introduction and commentary, The Psalms (1950)

References

External link

English Jews
English editors
1887 births
1957 deaths
People from Reading, Berkshire
People from Birmingham, West Midlands